Three Secrets is a 1950 American drama film directed by Robert Wise and starring Eleanor Parker, Patricia Neal and Ruth Roman. It was released by Warner Bros.

Plot
A private plane crashes in the California mountains and a 5-year-old boy survives. Little else is known except the child is an orphan.

Susan Chase believes the boy could be hers. Before she was wed to lawyer Bill Chase, she was involved with a Marine during the war, and became suicidal later, putting their child up for adoption. Bill has never been told Susan's secret.

Newspaper reporter Phyllis Horn investigates the crash. She, too, has a secret, having given birth after a divorce from husband Bob Duffy, who has since remarried.

A third woman, Ann Lawrence, turns up at the crash site as well. Ann was once a chorus girl, involved with wealthy Gordon Crossley, who spurned her after she became pregnant. Scorned, Ann bludgeoned him to death, and served five years in prison for manslaughter, giving up the baby. The boy appears to be hers, but she believes Susan is better qualified to give the child a good home.

Cast
 Eleanor Parker as Susan Adele Connors Chase
 Patricia Neal as Phyllis Horn
 Ruth Roman as Ann Lawrence
 Frank Lovejoy as Bob Duffy
 Leif Erickson as Bill Chase
 Ted de Corsia as Del Prince 
 Edmon Ryan as Hardin
 Larry Keating as Mark Harrison
 Katherine Warren as Mrs. Connors
 Arthur Franz as Paul Radin

See also
 List of American films of 1950

References

External links

1950 films
1950 drama films
American drama films
American aviation films
Films directed by Robert Wise
Films scored by David Buttolph
Films set in California
Warner Bros. films
American black-and-white films
1950s English-language films
1950s American films